This is the list of voivodes of Chernihiv. A Chernihiv voivode was a Muscovite military position in Cossack Hetmanate.

 Prince Feodor Mezetskiy (1534–1537)
 Prince Mikhail Troyekurov-Akhmet (1553–1557)
 Ivan Ochin-Plescheyev (1556–1557)
 Matvei "Dyak" Rzhevskiy (1559–1563), siege voivode
 Prince Vasiliy Prozorovskiy (1563–1566)
 Foma Tretiakov (1563)
 Feodor Nagoi (1566–1567)
 Prince Osip Scherbatov (1576–1578)
 Prince Ivan "Shiban" Dolgorukov (1543, 1578–1584)
 Afanasiy Zagryazhskiy (1582)
 Prince Ivan Turenin-Obolenskiy (1586–1589)
 Semeon Saburov-Papin (1595)
 Prince Feodor Nogotkov-Obolenskiy (1596)
 Prince Vasiliy Musa Turenin (1596–1598)
 Prince Fyodor Sheremetev (1598)
 Andrei Izmailov (1598)
 Prince Mikhail Kashin-Obolenksiy (1603–1604)
 Prince Gavriil Korkodinov
 Prince Grigoriy Shakhovskoy
 Prince Boris Tatev (1604)
 Prince Ivan Tatev (1604)
 Prince Semeon Zvenigorodskiy (1605), second voivode
 Prince Andrei "Khripun" Teliatevskiy (1606)
 Andrei Dashkov (1658)
 Ivan Zagryazhskiy (1660–1662), siege voivode
 Prince Ignat Volkonskiy (1662–1665), siege voivode
 Ivan Pushkin (1682–1684)
 Prince Fedul Volkonskiy (1686–1689, possibly)
 Prince Feodor Shakhovskoy (1687)
 Semeon Neplyuyev (1689)
 Bogdan Polibin (1689–1696)
 Prince Feodor "Orleonok" Volkonskiy (1696–1698)
 Marcin Kalinowski (1635–1652)
 Krzysztof Tyszkiewicz (1658–1660)
 Stanisław Kazimierz Bieniewski (1660–1676)
 Jan Gniński (1678–1680)
 Mariusz Stanisław Jaskólski (1680–1683)
 Otto Friedrich von Fölkersahm (1685–1695)
 Franciszek Jan Załuski (1695–1717)
 Mikołaj Franciszek Krosnowski (1717–1723)
 Piotr Jan Potocki (1724–1726)
 Józef Lubomirski (1726–1732)
 Józef Potulicki (1732–1734)
 Jakub Florian Narzymski (1734–1737)
 Piotr Michał Miączyński (1737–1776)
 Franciszek Antoni Ledóchowski (1776–1783)
 Ludwik Wilga (1783–1795)

History of Chernihiv
Lists of office-holders in Ukraine